The following lists events that have happened in 1925 in the Qajar dynasty.

Incumbents
 Shah: Ahmad Shah Qajar (until December 15), Reza Shah (starting December 15)
 Prime Minister: Reza Shah (until December 15), Mohammad-Ali Foroughi (starting December 15)

Births
 ? - Ibrahim al-Musawi al-Zanjani, Islamic scholar and writer.

Deaths
 April 5 – Mohammad Ali Shah Qajar died in Sanremo, Italy.

References

 
Iran
Years of the 20th century in Iran
1920s in Iran
Iran